'La Belgika was a trading company that was active in the Congo Free State and the Belgian Congo. It produced, processed and exported commodities such as rubber, palm oil and coffee, and imported basic goods needed by the local people, which it sold in a network of stores.

Foundation

The limited partnership Vandenvinne et cie was founded on 15 November 1894.
It had an initial capital of 150,000 francs.
In 1896 it was renamed Comptoir d'exportation et d'importation Belgika, and on 20 June 1899 it took the name Belgika, comptoir colonial.
The administrative headquarters were in Brussels and the operational headquarters in Stanleyville ( Kisangani).

Activities

The company was mainly active in the eastern Congo.
It processed and exported coffee, rubber, palm oil, rice and cotton.
The company ran stores were it sold basic goods to the local people.

The subsidiary Belgikaor was set up in 1931 with a capital of 15 million francs, raised to 30 million francs in 1947.
Its purpose was to prospect for minerals in the Lowa and Pangi regions.
In 1932 Belgika and the Minière des Grands Lacs Africains (MGL) founded the Société Minière du Lualaba (Miluba), whose deposits in the mining area of the Compagnie du chemin de fer du Congo supérieur aux Grands Lacs africains (CFL) were exploited by Cobelmin.

In the late 1930s the commissioner of Orientale Province, Rodolphe Dufour, was the target of concerted and virulent attacks from La Belgika and the Kilo-Moto Gold Mines delivered by their influential representatives André Gilson, also president of the Association of Belgian Colonial Interests, and by General Georges Moulaert. 
They claimed that he failed to support colonial interests and caused great damage as a result.

In 1952 Belgika had capital of 103 million francs.
It employed 23 Europeans and 3,400 Africans.
A 1952 tourist guide showed that La Belgika had a hotel and provided car rentals with drivers.
At the end of the 1950s La Belgika employed 83 European agents and 15,000 Africans, mostly in the Orientale Province, Maniema District and Kivu District.
It had 250 local stores and three wholesale and retail stores.
It represented various European companies selling vehicles, machinery, insurance and travel services.

Notes

Sources

 

1894 establishments in the Congo Free State
Privately held companies of Belgium
Companies of the Democratic Republic of the Congo
History of the Democratic Republic of the Congo
Companies disestablished in 1964
1964 disestablishments in the Democratic Republic of the Congo